The Laredo Lemurs were a professional baseball team based in Laredo, Texas, that played in the independent American Association from 2012 to 2016. The team played their home games at the Uni-Trade Stadium in Laredo, replacing the Laredo Broncos of United League Baseball. The team withdrew from the league prior to the start of the 2017 season.

History
Until the 2012 season, the team was located in Shreveport, Louisiana, and was known as the Shreveport-Bossier Captains. In late 2011, the franchise announced its move to Laredo, and the team was renamed. Media coverage suggested that the move was motivated by a deteriorating ballpark and the "inability of the local market to support professional baseball."

In September 2013, the Lemurs' Tano Tijerina, a former minor-league pitcher in the Milwaukee Brewers' system, and the incoming County Judge for Webb County, was the starting pitcher in the inaugural "Family Chevrolet Sister Cities Baseball Classic" at Uni-Trade Stadium.

On May 3, 2017, the Lemurs announced that they would be withdrawing from the American Association and would not operate a team in 2017.

The franchise did not return in any capacity and was subsequently replaced in 2018 by the bi-national Tecolotes de los Dos Laredos of the Mexican League.

Season-by-season record

Playoffs
2012 season: Lost to Wichita 3–0 in semifinals.
2013 season: Lost to Wichita 3–1 in semifinals.
2015 season: Defeated Wichita 3–2 in semifinals; defeated Sioux City 3–1 to win championship.

References

External links

Laredo Lemurs Official Website
American Association Official Website

American Association of Professional Baseball teams
Professional baseball teams in Texas
Baseball teams disestablished in 2017
Sports in Laredo, Texas
2011 establishments in Texas
Baseball teams established in 2011
Defunct independent baseball league teams
2017 disestablishments in Texas
Defunct baseball teams in Texas